Walton is a civil parish in the metropolitan borough of the City of Leeds, West Yorkshire, England.  The parish contains five listed buildings that are recorded in the National Heritage List for England.  Of these, one is listed at Grade II*, the middle of the three grades, and the others are at Grade II, the lowest grade.  The listed buildings consist of a church, its former vicarage, two houses, and a gun emplacement for the Second World War.


Key

Buildings

References

Citations

Sources

 

Lists of listed buildings in West Yorkshire